The Tayside Musketeers are a Scottish basketball club based in the town of Arbroath, Scotland.

Teams
The senior women's team compete in the Scottish Women's National League, the highest level in Scotland and the second highest in the United Kingdom, behind the professional Women's British Basketball League.

The club also fields teams in the U18 Men, U16 Men, U18 Women and U16 Women's National Leagues.

There is also a range of U14s, U12s, U10s and specific Girls basketball team sessions

History
Originally formed in 1993 by coach John Grant as Arbroath Musketeers, the club has gone through a range of changes and is now developing a range of teams under the direction of Steve Oakley (Director of Basketball) and a strong committee headed by Darren Logan (Chairman).

The Senior Men's team rejoined the Scottish Men's National League at the start of the 2014-2015 season for the first time since their only previous appearance, in 2002-03. The team resigned midway through the 2016-17 season.

The Senior Women's team joined the Women's National League at the start of the 2015-16 season.

Home arenas
Brechin Community Campus 
Forfar Community Campus
Salltire Sports & Fitness Centre

Honours
Junior Men (Under 18)
 Scottish Cup Winners (1996, 2002 )
 National League Division 1 Winners (2001, 2013)
 National League Division 2 Winners (1998, 2000)
Cadet Men (Under 16)
 Scottish Cup Winners (1995, 2000)
 National League Division 1 Winners (1994, 2000, 2011)
 National League Division 1 Playoffs Winners (2011)
 National League Division 2 Winners (2008)

Men's season-by-season records

The team withdrew from the 2016-17 season with seven games remaining.

References

1993 establishments in Scotland
Basketball teams established in 1993
Basketball teams in Scotland
Sport in Angus, Scotland
Arbroath